Fakhriyeh (also Romanized as Fakhrīyeh; also known as Fakhrīyeh Va Kalāteh-ye Ḩabashī) is a village in Fazl Rural District, in the Central District of Nishapur County, Razavi Khorasan Province, Iran. At the 2006 census, its population was 299, in 83 families.

References 

Populated places in Nishapur County